The following is a list of international organization leaders in 2008.

UN organizations

Political and economic organizations

Financial organizations

Sports organizations

Other organizations

See also
List of state leaders in 2008
List of religious leaders in 2008
List of colonial governors in 2008
List of international organization leaders in 2007
List of international organization leaders in 2009

References

2008
2008 in international relations
Lists of office-holders in 2008